An Election to the Edinburgh Corporation was held on 2 November 1920, alongside municipal elections across Scotland. The election was the first following the absorption of Leith and parts of the Edinburgh suburbs into Edinburgh Corporation. The area previously comprising Edinburgh Corporation continued to return 50 members, and Leith returned 12, and the new suburbs 9. The new Edinburgh Corporation therefore had a total of 71 members. There were contests in 12 of the 16 wards, and the election saw Labours total representation for Edinburgh & Leith reduced from 7 to 4.

Aggregate results

Ward Results

References

1920
1920 Scottish local elections